The 2012 NASL Playoffs was the postseason tournament culminating the 2012 North American Soccer League season to determine the champion of the 2012 North American Soccer League.  The top six regular season finishers qualified for the playoffs and competed in a single-elimination tournament, composed of three rounds.  The tournament began September 29 and concluded on October 26.

Format

Qualification

Bracket

Schedule

Quarterfinals

Semifinals

First leg

Second leg

Championship

First leg

Second leg

Playoff statistical leaders

See also 
 2012 in American soccer
 2012 North American Soccer League season
 2012 Lamar Hunt U.S. Open Cup

References

External links 

Playoffs